Thoms is a surname. Notable people with the surname include:

Adah Belle Thoms (1870–1943), African-American nurse
Albie Thoms (1941–2012), Australian film director
Alexander Thoms (1837–1925), Scottish mineralogist
Arne Thoms (born 1971), German tennis player
Art Thoms (born 1947), American football player
Bill Thoms (1910–1964), Canadian ice hockey player
Bob Thoms (1826–1903), English cricket umpire
Bobby Thoms (1909–2003), Australian rules footballer
Daniela Anschütz-Thoms (born 1974), German speed skater
Frederic Count de Thoms (1669–1746), German art collector
George Thoms (1927–2003), Australian cricket player
Harry Thoms (1896–1970), English footballer
Jerome Thoms (1907–1977), American film editor
Jim Thoms (1918–2005), Australian rules footballer
Kevin Thoms (born 1979), American actor
Laurence Thoms (born 1980), Fijian alpine skier
Lothar Thoms (1956–2017), German cyclist
Paul Thoms (1932–2012), Canadian surveyor and politician
Peter Thoms, English musician
Peter Perring Thoms (1791–1855), English printer and translator
Shirley Thoms (1925–1999), Australian country music player
Tracie Thoms (born 1975), American actress
Trev Thoms (1950–2010), British guitarist
William Thoms (1803–1885), British writer

Surnames from given names